Notolibellula bicolor is a species of dragonfly in the family Libellulidae, 
known as the bicoloured skimmer. 
It is the only known species of Notolibellula.
It is found across northern Australia where it inhabits rock-holes and still waters.
It is a medium-sized dragonfly with the male having a bluish thorax and a red end to his abdomen.

Etymology
The species name bicolor obviously refers to this dragonfly's two vivid colours, blue and red, observed by Tony Watson in the Kimberley region of Western Australia in 1968.

Gallery

See also
 List of Odonata species of Australia

References

Libellulidae
Odonata of Australia
Insects of Australia
Endemic fauna of Australia
Taxa named by Günther Theischinger
Taxa named by J.A.L. (Tony) Watson
Insects described in 1977